Tomasz Maruszewski (1769–1834) was a prominent participant in the Kościuszko Uprising.

A burgher and Polish Jacobin, he was a member of Kołłątaj's Forge and was ennobled by the Great Sejm in 1790.

After pro-reform forces were defeated in the 1792 War in Defense of the Constitution, together with Hugo Kołłątaj he emigrated to Saxony, but in 1793 he returned to Poland.

On behalf of Tadeusz Kościuszko he went to Warsaw, where he helped organize the Warsaw Uprising. When the Uprising had succeeded, he was likely responsible for the subsequent execution of Targowica Confederation members.

He left Poland again after the defeat of the Kościuszko Uprising and the Third Partition of Poland (1795).

To the end he worked closely with Kołłątaj.

1769 births
1834 deaths
Kościuszko insurgents
Polish Jacobins